Le Corps de mon ennemi (also known as Body of My Enemy ) is a 1976 French crime film directed by Henri Verneuil.

Plot
After François Leclercq seduces the young and rich Gilberte Beaumont-Liégard, she introduces him to her family. Through the budding relationship with her in-laws, Leclercq is able to assimilate into the local upper class of his hometown, Cornai. A friend of Gilberte's father, Raphaël Di Massa hires him as manager of his new nightclub, "Number One". The oblivious parvenu Leclercq eventually discovers that "Number One" is actually a cover-up for Raphaël Di Massa's illegal drug trade. Following a dispute between Di Massa and Leclercq, the gun of the latter is stolen and used in the murder of a local football star. An orchestrated miscarriage of justice puts Leclercq in prison, despite his innocence. Seven years later, he returns to Cornai and discovers that it wasn't Di Massa, but Gilberte's father Jean-Baptiste Beaumont-Liégard who ran the drug operation during Leclercq's employment. In an act of retaliation, Leclercq turns Beaumont-Liégard's accomplices against him. As Jean-Baptiste Beaumont-Liégard is executed, Leclercq leaves the city satisfied with his revenge.

Cast
 Jean-Paul Belmondo: François Leclercq
 Bernard Blier: Jean-Baptiste Beaumont-Liégard
 Marie-France Pisier: Gilberte Beaumont-Liégard, Jean-Baptiste's daughter
 François Perrot: Raphaël Di Massa
 Daniel Ivernel: Victor Verbruck, the mayor
 Claude Brosset: Oscar 
 Yvonne Gaudeau: Madame Beaumont-Liégard 
 René Lefèvre: Pierre Leclercq, François' father
 Michel Beaune: a childhood friend of François
 Nicole Garcia: Hélène Mauve/Duquesne
 Élisabeth Margoni: Karine Lechard
 Jacques David: Prosecutor Torillon
 Françoise Bertin: René's wife

Score
Francis Lai's score was released by WIP Records in 1976.
 Le Corps De Mon Ennemi  (2:25)
 Je Me Souviens De Ce Temps Là  (1:06)
 Je L'Aime, Elle M'Aimait  (2:58)
 Ma Ville À Perpétuité  (1:55)
 Magic's Power  (3:19)
 Mademoiselle  (1:29)
 Et Puis Tu M'As Oublié  (0:52)
 Your Hair In My Eyes  (3:47)
 Number One  (3:36)
 Je Me Souviens De Ce Temps Là  (2:33)
 Ma Ville, Mes Amours  (1:52)
 Jack Pot  (3:21)
 Je Ne Suis Pas Des Tiens  (1:04)
 La Valse Des Souvenirs  (2:25)
 Au Creux De La Nuit  (0:56)
 Le Corps De Mon Ennemi  (2:25)

References

External links
 
Body of My Enemy at Le Film Guide
 
 
 

1976 films
1970s French-language films
1976 crime films
French gangster films
Films directed by Henri Verneuil
French films about revenge
Films with screenplays by Michel Audiard
Films scored by Francis Lai
Films based on French novels
Columbia Pictures films
1970s French films